Erik Konrad Affholter (born April 10, 1966) is a former professional American football wide receiver in the National Football League (NFL) for the Green Bay Packers.  As a 16-year-old place kicker during his junior season of high school he broke a national record with a 64-yard field goal, which at the time was the longest field goal kicked at any level. At the University of Southern California, he was an All-American and established USC records for most receptions in a season, and in a career.

Early and personal life
He was born in Detroit, Michigan, to Conrad (a salesman) and Ruth Affholter, and is Jewish. In the early 1970s, the family moved to Agoura, California. He later lived in Anthem, Arizona.

High school
Affholter played football at Oak Park High School in Ventura County, California. As a 16-year-old place kicker during his junior season he broke a national record with a 64-yard (59 meter) field goal in 1982, which at the time was the longest field goal kicked at any level. A sportswriter at the game estimated it could have gone 74 yards (68 meters). Asked about his kick, Affholter said: "I'd much rather catch touchdown passes." At the time, as a wide receiver he had caught more touchdown passes than any player in his high school conference.

In addition to kicking field goals and extra points, he played tailback, wide receiver, defensive back, and linebacker. In 1983 he was a USA Today All-USA high school football first-team All-American, All-California Interscholastic Federation (CIF), and All-State; he was also a Los Angeles Times running back of the year.

College
Affholter played college football at the University of Southern California (USC) for the Trojans as a wide receiver, though he had initially received a scholarship as a kicker. He was athletic, with a 36-inch (910 mm) vertical jump.

On November 21, 1987, he made a controversial memorable fourth quarter winning end zone juggling touchdown catch for a 17-13 upset over Troy Aikman's No. 5-ranked UCLA Bruins that sent the unranked 1987 USC Trojans football team to the 1988 Rose Bowl. He was named a member of the 1988 College Football All-America Team, and a Pac-10 All-Academic selection. In 1988 as a senior he led USC with 68 catches for 952 yards and eight touchdowns. He established USC records for most receptions in a season, and in a career (123). Upon graduation, he became a member of the USC Skull and Dagger Society.

National Football League
He was drafted in the fourth round of the 1989 NFL Draft by the Washington Redskins. On April 23, 1989, the Redskins then immediately traded him and two draft picks to the Green Bay Packers for quarterback Jeff Graham. About a month later he broke his ankle in a pick-up basketball game in New York City, shortly before reporting to Packers training camp. He spent the entire season on injured reserve. He played the 1991 season in the NFL for the Packers.

In 1992, he signed with the San Diego Chargers as a free agent. He retired in 1995 due to a career-ending knee injury.

Coaching
Since retiring, he has coached high school and youth football.

Honors
In 2016 he was inducted into the Southern California Jewish Sports Hall of Fame.

References

External links
Pro-Football-Reference
The Pro Football Archives
databaseFootball

1966 births
Living people
Jewish American sportspeople
People from Agoura Hills, California
Sportspeople from Los Angeles County, California
People from Maricopa County, Arizona
American football placekickers
American football wide receivers
USC Trojans football players
Green Bay Packers players
Players of American football from Detroit
Players of American football from California
Players of American football from Arizona
21st-century American Jews